Hersey-Duncan House is a historic home located near Wilmington, New Castle County, Delaware. It was built about 1800, and is a two-story, five-bay, center passage
plan dwelling with a gable roof and two-story, stone, rear kitchen wing. It is in a vernacular Federal style.  A stuccoed frame, one-story, gable-roof kitchen was added to the north endwall of the main block about 1950 and a two-story frame wing was added to the south side of the rear kitchen wing in the 1930s.  Also on the property is a contributing 19th century, stone smokehouse. The house was built by a prominent Red Clay Creek miller in the early 19th century.

It was added to the National Register of Historic Places in 1990.

References

Houses on the National Register of Historic Places in Delaware
Federal architecture in Delaware
Houses completed in 1800
Houses in Wilmington, Delaware
National Register of Historic Places in Wilmington, Delaware